Giambattista Lolli (1698 – 4 June 1769) was an Italian chess player and one of the most important chess theoreticians of his time. He is most famous for his book Osservazioni teorico-pratiche sopra il giuoco degli scacchi, published 1763 in Bologna. Born in Nonantola, Modena, he was one of the Modenese Masters. The checkmate pattern "Lolli's mate" involves infiltrating an opponents fianchetto position using both a pawn and queen, and is named after Giambattista Lolli.

Openings

Lolli's book contains analyses of chess openings, in particular the Giuoco Piano. Against the Two Knights defense, the line 1.e4 e5 2.Nf3 Nc6 3.Bc4 Nf6 4.Ng5 d5 5.exd5 Nxd5 6. d4 is named the Lolli Variation. In the King's Gambit the variation 1.e4 e5 2.f4 exf4 3.Nf3 g5 4.Bc4 g4 5.Bxf7+ is designated the Lolli Gambit. It illustrates the Italian masters' style of uncompromising attack, which clearly differs from the rather more strategic considerations taken by, for example, the French chess player Philidor. However, it is considered obsolete as Black can obtain the advantage by 5...Kxf7 6.Ne5+ Ke8 7.Qxg4 Nf6 8.Qxf4 d6, and White does not have enough for the piece. (The Muzio Gambit, 5.O-O, is more promising).

Endgames
In addition, the book contains listings of 100 chess endgames. One of these positions was used by Wilhelm Heinse in his novel Anastasia und das Schachspiel (English: Anastasia and the game of chess). This Lolli Position is from the pawnless endgame of a rook and bishop versus a rook. Although this endgame is a draw in general, White to move wins in this position . Lolli also studied some defensive fortresses and the queen versus pawn endgame.

Notes

References 

1698 births
1769 deaths
Chess theoreticians
Italian chess players
Italian chess writers
Sportspeople from the Province of Modena